Clint Hocking (born 18 September 1972) is a Canadian video game designer and director. He has primarily worked at the Canadian divisions of Ubisoft, where he developed three titles, and briefly worked at LucasArts, Valve, and Amazon Game Studios.

Hocking started his career at Ubisoft, where he first designed and wrote scripts for 2002's Tom Clancy's Splinter Cell. He rose to prominence when he moved up to direct 2005's Tom Clancy's Splinter Cell: Chaos Theory, which was both a critical and commercial success. He went on direct 2008's Far Cry 2, which was positively received by critics. In 2010, he left Ubisoft Montreal due to him being "too comfortable" at the studio. Between 2010 and 2015, Hocking joined LucasArts, Valve, and Amazon Game Studios in various senior roles. Throughout this period, he did not release any new games and in August 2015 returned to Ubisoft, this time at their Toronto studio. At this studio, he directed Watch Dogs: Legion (2020) which was also positively received by critics. By July 2021, he returned to Montreal studio and is due to direct Assassin's Creed: Codename Hexe and co-direct the Assassin's Creed Infinity game platform with Jonathan Dumont. Across his career, Hocking has written monthly columns for the video game magazine Edge, and coined the term ludonarrative dissonance.

Early life 
Hocking was born on 18 September 1972 and is from Montreal, Canada.

Career 
Hocking started his career as a writer for website companies whilst completing his Master of Fine Arts in creative writing at the University of British Columbia in Vancouver. During this time, he was experimenting with the level editor UnreadlEd, which he used to make a mod and complete a game level. With this experience, he sent his resume in as "a lark" to Ubisoft Montreal and was subsequently hired as a level designer on 2002's Tom Clancy's Splinter Cell. During development, both the scriptwriter and game designer left the project and Hocking took on both roles, in addition to being a level designer. Upon release, Tom Clancy's Splinter Cell was well-received by critics, receiving "universal acclaim" according to review aggregator Metacritic.

After the release of Tom Clancy's Splinter Cell, Ubisoft Montreal began development for 2005's Tom Clancy's Splinter Cell: Chaos Theory and Hocking continued as the scriptwriter as well as the lead level designer. In the alpha stage of development, Hocking initially declined the creative director role due to having two positions already, but he changed his mind a week later. During the game's two-year development, Hocking was working 80 hours a week. This large workload caused him to have gaps in his recent memory, such as completely forgetting a week he spent socialising with a former colleague due to brain damage. Upon release, Tom Clancy's Splinter Cell: Chaos Theory was universally acclaimed by critics and was a commercial success. Soon after, development of 2008's Far Cry 2, a first-person shooter featuring an open world environment set in a fictional African country, started with Hocking as the creative director and scriptwriter. Upon release, Far Cry 2 was positively received by critics. Hocking and critics noted some of its reception was polarizing, which he attributed to the game breaking many conventions of the shooter and open world genre. Some gameplay elements, which immersed the player, critics found polarizing. This included when the player's firearm would jam, a map being a crumpled piece of paper in the player character's hands as opposed to one found within a menu, and malaria which the player character can get throughout the game and needs to treated by medicine from civilians otherwise the player character will die.

In May 2010, after almost nine years at Ubisoft Montreal, Hocking left because he felt he had become "too comfortable" at the studio and wanted a new challenge. Three months later, Hocking joined LucasArts, based in San Francisco, as the creative director on an unannounced project. In June 2012, Hocking left LucasArts without releasing a new game. He stated he wanted to move "on to something new"; It is not known what projects he was working whilst at LucasArts. Two weeks later, Hocking joined Valve in Seattle, Washington in an unspecified role. In January 2014, Hocking left Valve without releasing a game.

In April of the same year, joined Amazon Game Studios, also based in Seattle. Hocking worked as a senior game designer an unspecified project for Amazon's Fire devices. In August 2015, he left Amazon Game Studios. Hocking said he enjoyed working with new people but wanted to work on something that people will get to play, having realized that he has not shipped a game in seven years. Hocking also expressed difficulties in obtaining a green card and being on his third visa whilst in the United States, which was another reason he wanted to return to Canada. A few days later, he returned to Ubisoft, this time at their Toronto studio, saying it felt like a reunion. He was excited to return to Ubisoft, and he stated: "I know most of the people who were involved in founding the studio personally, and almost all of them are still here". Hocking's first project at the studio was as creative director for Watch Dogs: Legion, a game that was announced at E3 2019. Hocking noted that most of the developers who worked on Watch Dogs (2014) and Watch Dogs 2 (2016) were part of his team when he directed Far Cry 2. Legion was released in October 2020 and received positive reviews from critics.

By July 2021, he returned to Ubisoft Montreal. Hocking, alongside Jonathan Dumont, will serve as Assassin's Creed Infinity creative directors with Dumont and Hocking leading the Ubisoft Quebec and Montreal divisions, respectively.

Across his career, Hocking has written monthly columns for the video game magazine, Edge. Additionally, he was a part of an Advisory Committee with industry veterans Raph Koster, Ray Muzyka, Ryan Lesser, and Brian Reynolds to pick Special Award winners at Game Developers Choice Awards 2008.

Ludonarrative dissonance 

In a 2007 blog post, Hocking coined the term ludonarrative dissonance as a term for the conflict between a video game's narrative told through the story and the video game's narrative told through the gameplay. Ludonarrative, a compound of ludology and narrative, refers to the intersection in a video game of ludic elements (gameplay) and narrative elements. In the post, he critiqued BioShock (2007), feeling that while the narrative wants the protagonist to be selfless, the actual mechanics of BioShock rely on selfishness and the pursuit of power.

Personal life 
Hocking has a wife and one son. He identifies as a socialist.

Works

Video games

Films and television

References

External links
 

1972 births
21st-century Canadian writers
Canadian video game designers
Creative directors
Living people
Ubisoft people
University of British Columbia alumni
Video game directors
Video game writers